Rick Waugh may refer to:
Rick Waugh (banker), Canadian banker
Rick Waugh, a candidate in  United States House of Representatives elections in Virginia, 2010#District 7